Mika Leinonen (born 5 October 1957) is a retired Swedish footballer. Leinonen made 30 Allsvenskan appearances for Djurgården and scored 0 goals.

References

Swedish footballers
Allsvenskan players
Djurgårdens IF Fotboll players
1957 births
Living people
Association footballers not categorized by position